Virginia's 47th House of Delegates district elects one of 100 seats in the Virginia House of Delegates, the lower house of the state's bicameral legislature. District 47 represents part of Arlington County. The seat is currently held by Democrat Patrick A. Hope.

Geography 
District 47, representing part of Arlington County, is located in Virginia's 8th Congressional District.

Elections 
Democrat Patrick A. Hope first took office in 2010, after winning a three-way race in the 2009 general election; he earned 63.54% of the vote. He has been reelected in 2011, 2013, 2015, and 2017, each time winning at least 76% of the vote. In 2019, he ran unopposed in the general election. In the 2021 Democratic primary, Hope faces a challenge from Matt Rogers, chief of staff for state senator Dave Marsden.

References

Arlington County, Virginia
Virginia House of Delegates districts